The men's team Nordic combined competition for the 1994 Winter Olympics in Lillehammer was held at Lysgårdsbakken and Birkebeineren Ski Stadium on 23 and 24 February.

Japan's margin of victory, preceded by their four-minute margin of victory at the FIS Nordic World Ski Championships in Falun the previous year, would lead the FIS to change the Nordic combined team event from a 3 x 10 km relay to a 4 x 5 km relay later in 1994 that would become effective at the FIS Nordic World Ski Championships 1995 in Thunder Bay and at the 1998 Winter Olympics in Nagano.

Results

Ski jumping
Each of the three team members performed a single jump that was judged in the same format as the Olympic ski jumping competition. The scores for all the jumps each team were combined and used to calculate their deficit in the cross-country skiing portion of the event. Each point difference between teams in the ski jumping portion in this event resulted in a five second difference in the cross country part of the event.

Cross-country

Each member of the team completed a ten kilometre cross-country skiing leg.

References

External links
 Sports-Reference - 1994 Nordic Combined Men's team

Nordic combined at the 1994 Winter Olympics